D. C. Mitchell (born January 3, 1888) was an American college football and basketball player and coach. He served as the head football coach at Gustavus Adolphus College in St. Peter, Minnesota from 1922 to 1925, Hamline University in Saint Paul, Minnesota from 1926 to 1930, and Macalester College in Saint Paul in 1945.

Head coaching record

Football

References

1888 births
Year of death missing
American men's basketball players
Gustavus Adolphus Golden Gusties athletic directors
Gustavus Adolphus Golden Gusties baseball coaches
Gustavus Adolphus Golden Gusties football coaches
Gustavus Adolphus Golden Gusties men's basketball coaches
Hamline Pipers athletic directors
Hamline Pipers football coaches
Hamline Pipers men's basketball coaches
Macalester Scots football coaches
Nebraska Cornhuskers men's basketball players
People from Hiawatha, Kansas
Coaches of American football from Kansas
Basketball coaches from Kansas
Basketball players from Kansas